The Kalvøyrevet Bridge is a cantilever bridge in the municipality of Herøy in Nordland county, Norway. The bridge connects the small islands of Kalvøya and Hestøya and it was built as a part of Norwegian County Road 166 which connects the larger islands of Indre Øksningan and Ytre Øksningan with the rest of Herøy Municipality.

See also
List of bridges in Norway
List of bridges in Norway by length
List of bridges
List of bridges by length

References

Herøy, Nordland
Road bridges in Nordland